Brandon Jake Bair (born November 24, 1984) is a former American football defensive end. He played college football at the University of Oregon. He was first signed by the Kansas City Chiefs as an undrafted free agent in 2011. He later played for the Oakland Raiders and the Philadelphia Eagles before retiring after five years in the NFL.

College career

College statistics

Professional career

NFL career statistics

Regular season

Personal life
His younger brother, Stetzon Bair, played football for the University of Oregon. He currently lives in St. Anthony, Idaho with his wife and four daughters and is the general manager of Henry's Fork Homes. He often hosts football camps for kids and teens.

On May 6, 2021, he rescued a man from a burning semi-truck after it was struck by a train in St. Anthony, Idaho. For those actions, he received a Carnegie Medal.

References

External links
Oakland Raiders bio 
Kansas City Chiefs bio
Oregon Ducks bio
Philadelphia Eagles bio

1984 births
Living people
Players of American football from Idaho
American football defensive ends
Oregon Ducks football players
Kansas City Chiefs players
Oakland Raiders players
Philadelphia Eagles players
People from Rexburg, Idaho